Ralph Ipres (c. 1336 – 1397), of Quernmore, Lancsahire, was an English politician.

He was a Member (MP) of the Parliament of England for Lancashire in 1378, January 1390 and 1393.

References

1336 births
1397 deaths
English MPs 1378
Members of the Parliament of England (pre-1707) for Lancashire
English MPs January 1390
English MPs 1393